Celaenorrhinus ambareesa, commonly known as the Malabar spotted flat, is a species of hesperiid butterfly found in India.

Range
The butterfly is found in India and ranges from South India to Khandesh, Madhya Pradesh to West Bengal.

Description 

Unlike the common spotted flat, the semi-transparent white spots on the upperside of the forewings are separated from each other. It also has distinct rows of pale yellow spots on the hindwing and the hairy fringe of the wings (cilia) is chequered with black and white. All the spotted flats have similar habits and habitats. The Malabar spotted flat is more likely to be found under boulders and logs overhanging forest streams.

In 1891 Edward Yerbury Watson described it as:

Wingspan: 45 to 55 mm.

Distribution 
This butterfly is commonly found in moist-deciduous, semi-evergreen and secondary evergreen forests with a dense herb and shrub layers. It is particularly frequent in places where openings in the canopy let sunlight fall on the ground vegetation.

The butterfly is most commonly seen in the post monsoon season. The population is low in the winter and summer months but increases prior to the monsoon.

Status
Not rare.

Cited references

See also
Hesperiidae
List of butterflies of India (Hesperiidae)

References

Print

Online
.

ambareesa
Butterflies of Asia